Korku (also known as Kurku, or Muwasi) is an Austroasiatic language spoken by the Korku tribe of central India, in the states of Madhya Pradesh and Maharashtra. It is isolated in the midst of the Gondi people, who are Dravidian, while its closest relatives are in eastern India. It is the westernmost Austroasiatic language.

Korkus are also closely associated with the Nihali people, many of whom have traditionally lived in special quarters of Korku villages. Korku is spoken by around 700,000 people, mainly in four districts of southern Madhya Pradesh (Khandwa, Harda, Betul, Narmadapuram) and three districts of northern Maharashtra (Rajura and Korpana tahsils of Chandrapur district, Manikgarh pahad area near Gadchandur in Chandrapur district) (Amravati, Buldana, Akola).

The name Korku comes from Koro-ku (-ku is the animate plural), Koro 'person, member of the Korku community' (Zide 2008).

Sociolinguistics
The Indian national census of 2011 reported 727,133 people claiming to speak Korku, which is an unscheduled language according to the Indian system. However, Korku is classified as “vulnerable” by UNESCO, the least concerning of the levels of language endangerment nonetheless. Most adult men are bilingual in Hindi, or multilingual in Hindi and the local Dravidian languages (Zide 2008: 156). Literacy in the language is low.

Throughout recent history, the use of the Korku language has been heavily influenced by larger hegemonic languages, especially Hindi. A few Korku-speaking groups have had relative success in increasing the viability of their dialect, specifically the Potharia Korku from the Vindhya Mountains.

Dialects 
Zide (2008:256) lists two dialects for Korku, a Western and an Eastern one. The Western Dialect, which has a handful of subdialects is also called Korku. Among the Western varieties, the one spoken in Lahi is notable for its loss of the dual number. 
Western (aka Korku) dialect: spoken in the districts of Melghat, Betul-Narmadapuram, and Narmadapuram. 
Eastern (aka Muwasi/Mowasi/Mawasi, or Kurku): spoken in the Chhindwara district of northeastern Maharashtra.
Glottolog lists four dialects for Korku:

 Ruma (Korku)
 Bondoy
 Bouriya
 Mawasi

Geographical Distribution
Korku is spoken in the following regions (Zide 2008:256):
South-central Madhya Pradesh
East Nimar district (Khandwa district)
Betul district
Narmadapuram district
Chhindwara district (Mawasi speakers)
Northeastern Maharashtra
Amravati district (majority of speakers in Maharashtra)
Buldana district
Akola district

Phonology

Vowels 
Korku has 10 phonemic vowels, which can occur short or long (e.g. /aː/), plus one mid vowel that only occurs as a short segment /ə/.

Consonants 
Korku has a large consonant phoneme inventory, in which stops occur in several places of articulation. Like many languages of India, Korku stops distinguish between voiced, plain voiceless, and voiceless aspirated consonants.

Word-finally, all stops are unreleased.

Morphosyntax
Korku is a highly agglutinating, suffixing language. It has postpositions, a case system, a two-gender system, and three numbers. The verb phrase can be complex in Korku; functions that in English and other languages may be encoded in by the use of auxiliary verbs and of prepositions may be expressed in Korku through suffixation.

Word order 
Korku, as all Munda languages, shows a strict Subject-Object-Verb (SOV) word order.  

Adjectives are expressed verbally - as intransitive verbs - with the exception of a few cases in which a separate word occurs before the noun they are modifying.

Morphology 
Nouns in Korku are assigned one of two grammatical genders: animate, and inanimate, and inflect for several different grammatical cases.

Grammatical number 
Korku distinguishes three grammatical numbers: singular, dual (two of X), and plural (three or more of X) for nouns in the animate class. Nouns in the inanimate class are rarely marked for number. Final vowels are sometimes deleted before dual or plural endings (see the example at koɾo).

Case system 
In Korku, the function of participants in a sentence (e.g. agent, patient, etc.) is expressed through grammatical case markings on nouns. Additionally, ideas that are expressed via prepositions in English (e.g. towards, from, with, etc.) are also expressed via case markings in Korku. The table below illustrates the different cases and the suffixes used to express them.

Additionally, Korku regularly marks direct object on the verb, as in other Munda languages. In the sentence below, the suffix /eɟ/ on the verb compound /senɖawkʰen/ indicates that it was someone else who was given permission to go.

Pronouns

Personal pronouns 
Personal pronouns in Korku show different number and gender patterns depending on the person. The first person (“I, we”) distinguishes not only the three numbers but also whether the hearer is included (“all of us”) or excluded (“us, but not you”) in the communicative context. The second person (“you, you all”) only encodes number, whereas the third person (“s/he, they”) distinguishes gender, and number for animate nouns.

Demonstratives 
In Korku, demonstratives (e.g. “this, that, those”) encode not only distance (e.g. “here and there”) but also gender and number. Unlike English, which only distinguishes between a single proximal (this) and distal (that) spatial references, Korku demonstratives encode four levels of proximity to the speaker (i.e. ‘very close’ vs. ‘close’ vs. ‘far’ vs. ‘very far’), plus a fifth distinction, when one is pinpointing. The table below illustrates the forms used in Korku.

Lexicon

Numerals 
The basic cardinal numbers from 1 to 10 (transcribed in IPA) are:

Numbers after 11 are mainly of Indo-Aryan origin.

Kinship terms 
As with many Austroasiatic languages, Korku has several words to refer to members of one's family, including the extended family and in-laws. There are often separate terms for people depending on their gender and seniority, for instance /bawan/ “wife's older brother” and /kosɾeʈ/ “elder brother's son”. In the tables below, words that include the suffix -/ʈe/ refer to someone else's family member, so that /kon/ means “my son”, whereas /konʈe/ is used when talking about someone else's son, for instance /ɖukriaʔ konʈe/ “the old woman's son”.

Korku has words to refer to pairs or groups of people in the family.

Writing system
The Korku language uses the Balbodh style of the Devanagari script, which is also used to write the Marathi language.

References

Further reading
Anderson, Gregory D. S. (ed.), The Munda languages. Routledge Language Family Series 3.New York: Routledge. .
Nagaraja, K. S. (1999). Korku language: grammar, texts, and vocabulary. Tokyo: Institute for the Study of Languages and Cultures of Asia and Africa, Tokyo University of Foreign Studies.
Zide, Norman H. (1963). Korku noun morphology. [Chicago: South Asian Languages Program, University of Chicago. 
Zide, Norman H. (1960). Korku verb morphology. [S.l: s.n.]
Zide, Norman H. (2008). "Korku". In Gregory D. S. Anderson (ed.), The Munda languages, 256–298. Routledge Language Family Series 3. New York: Routledge. .

External links
 Ae... kalaavati... a korku song at YouTube.com

Munda languages
Endangered languages of India
Endangered Austroasiatic languages
Vulnerable languages